Caleb Johnson (born 1991) is an American singer.

Caleb Johnson may also refer to:

 Caleb Johnson (baseball) (1844–1925), American baseball player
 Caleb Johnson (American football) (born 1998), American football linebacker

See also
Kaleb Johnson (born 1993), American football guard